Savarna (Sanskrit: सावर्ण, IAST: sāvarṇa) or Savarni/Shavarna is a Brahmin gotra that comprises Kanyakubja Brahmins and Saryupareen Brahmins who are the descendants of sage Savarna Muni. The origins of Savarna gotra can be traced back to the origins of Kanyakubja Brahmins in Kannauj, Uttar Pradesh.

History & beliefs 
Savarna Brahmins are believed to be the descendants of sage Savarna Muni (or Savarni Muni), belonging to the family of Bhrigu. Several ancient Indian literary works and inscriptions suggest that Savarna Brahmins have five Pravaras -   Aurva, Chyavana, Bhargava, Jamadagnya and Apnavana.

Savarna Brahmins have historically been the followers of Samaveda, with Gandharva Veda being their preferred Upa Veda (sub-Veda).

According to the kulapanjikas, the genealogical chronicles of some Bengali Brahmin communities, Savarna gotra Brahmins were one of the five Brahmin gotras (along with Shandilya, Bharadwaj, Kashyap and Vatsya) that immigrated from Uttar Pradesh and Bihar to Bengal in the 11th century. This branch of Bengali Savarna Brahmins is known as Kulin Brahmins, who are further classified in two sections based on their geographic characteristics - Rarh Brahmins and Varendra Brahmins.

Present 
Today, Brahmins of Savarna gotra can be found across India and Nepal. However, their surnames vary from region to region.

Savarna Brahmins in Western, Central and Northern India usually carry 'Trivedi (Tiwari or Tripathi)', 'Dwivedi (Mishra or Dubey)', Pandey or Upadhyay as their surnames. Maithil Brahmins are usually carry 'Choudhary' 'Mishra' 'Jha' as their surnames. Ones in West Bengal and Orrisa would put Ganguly or Gangopadhyay.

Notable People
 Sourav Ganguly, Former Indian cricket captain and current BCCI President
 Manoj Tiwari, Indian politician, currently actor serving as the Member of Parliament from North East Delhi
 Kedar Nath Upadhyay, Chief Justice of Nepal at Supreme Court
 Kisari Mohan Ganguli, Indian translator (Mahabharata into English)
 Narayan Gangopadhyay (1918–1970), Bengali writer
 Chandra Shekhar Azad (born Chandrashekhar Tiwari), Indian independence activist
 Kishore Kumar, singer and actor
 Ashok Kumar, actor

See also
Kanyakubja Brahmin
Bhrigu
Gotra

References

Brahmin gotras